Pristidactylus scapulatus, Burmeister's anole, is a species of lizard in the family Leiosauridae. The species is endemic to Argentina.

References

Pristidactylus
Reptiles of Argentina
Reptiles described in 1861
Taxa named by Hermann Burmeister